The 1957–58 Liga Alef season saw Beitar Jerusalem win the title. However, there was no promotion to Liga Leumit or relegation to Liga Bet, after the Israel Football Association decided to abandon the league before the end of the season, due to suspicions of bribery.

Final table

References
1957-58 Bnei Yehuda 

Liga Alef seasons
Israel
2